The Green Hope  is a 2000 Hong Kong television drama produced by TVB under producer Tsang Kan-cheong and starring Bowie Lam, Stephen Fung, Yoyo Mung, Joey Yung, Melissa Ng and Cathy Tsui.

Synopsis
In a cold Christmas in 1996, the workaholic Fong Kin-choi (Lau Dan) has been sick in bed. His dying wish is to find his youngest son Ka-him (Stephen Fung), who lived with his mother due to the divorce 12 years ago. After 12 years, Kin-choi's oldest son, Ka-fai (Bowie Lam), found out that his younger brother suffers from mental illness due to their mother, Wong Yuen-fan (Mary Hon) being drug abuser and forcing Ka-him to do illegal things since young age.

After his father died, Ka-fai took Ka-him in and helped him get back on his track as living as a normal person. Ka-fai notices his brother is a gifted musician, but his talent is hidden for years. With the help of Ka-fai, Ka-him's talent shows off and becomes a famous pianist, recognized by other people. It proves that although he's a minor mentally ill patient, he can still live a normal life and being successful just like others.

Throughout the show, Ka-him's struggle to success was littered with failures and discrimination by others due to his disability. Towards the end of the show, Ka-him's effort was eventually recognised. The show carries an inspiring underlying message that people with disabilities can succeed, and disability discrimination only contributes negatively to their struggle.

Cast
 Bowie Lam as Fong Ka-fai (方家輝), an interior designer.
 Stephen Fung as Fong Ka-him (方家謙), Ka-fai's younger brother who suffers from mental illness, but is a gifted musician.
 Yoyo Mung as Siu Lai-wah (邵麗華), Ka-fai's girlfriend.
 Joey Yung as Wai Man (韋文), Ka-him's girlfriend.
 Melissa Ng as Shum Kai-kwan (冼佳君), Ka-fai's ex-wife.
 Cathy Tsui as Yuen Ying (阮盈), a girl who admires Ka-him, but suffers from obsessive–compulsive disorder and autism.
 Vincent Kok as Pau Chi-chung (鮑子聰), Ka-him's friend who is an employee at a sheltered workshop.
 Tavia Yeung as Vivian Fung (馮慧慧), Man's friend.
 Lau Dan as Fong Kin-choi (方建材), Ka-fai and Ka-him's father.
 Mary Hon as Wong Yuen-fan (王婉芬), Ka-fai and Ka-him's mother.
 Helen Ma as Shum Pang Miu-chun (冼彭妙珍), Kai-kwan's mother.
 Li Shing-cheong as Wai Kuen (韋權), Man's older brother who is a traffic cop.
 Liu Kai-chi as Law Lok-tin (羅天樂), Ka-him's friend who is an instructor at a sheltered workshop.
 Lau Kong as Yeung Ting-chung (楊定忠)
 Cheuk Wan-chi as Tang Ho-ho (鄧浩浩), Ka-him's friend who is an employee at a sheltered workshop.
 Kwan Hoi-san as Yu Chin-sau (于漸秀), a deaf pianist who becomes Ka-him's mentor.
 Tin Kai-man as Frog (田雞), an employee at a sheltered workshop.
 Eddy Ko as Tung Yuen-chi (董志遠), Ho-ho's stepfather.
 Kenny Wong as Cheung Kai-keung (張介強), Kuen's friend who betrays him later on.

External links
 Story page at TVB website (in Cantonese)

TVB dramas
2000 Hong Kong television series debuts
2000 Hong Kong television series endings
Hong Kong romance television series
Serial drama television series
Television about mental health
2000s Hong Kong television series
2000s romance television series